The following are the winners of the 42nd annual (2015) Origins Award, presented at Origins 2016:

Fan Favorites

References

External links
 Origins Awards Winners  2016 - 42nd Annual Ceremony

2015 awards
2015 awards in the United States